Lower Croan (meaning lower little hut) is a farmstead in Cornwall, England, UK. It is in the parish of Egloshayle and Croan house (a quarter of a mile) and Croanford (half a mile) are to the east. Croan House is a manor house of two storeys and seven bays which was built in the 1690s for a prosperous attorney.

References

Farms in Cornwall